Elin Flyborg (born 5 October 1976) is a retired Swedish footballer. Flyborg was part of the Djurgården Swedish champions' team of 2003.

Honours

Club 
 Djurgården/Älvsjö 
 Damallsvenskan: 2003

References

Swedish women's footballers
Djurgårdens IF Fotboll (women) players
1976 births
Living people
Women's association football midfielders